Lake Monroe Bridge  was a two-lane steel bridge constructed over the St. Johns River at the west outlet of Lake Monroe between 1933 and 1934.  The bridge was a part of U.S. Route 17/92, and spanned the border between Seminole and Volusia Counties in Florida, United States.  On the Seminole side is Sanford and on the Volusia side is DeBary. Historical markers claim the bridge was the first electrically operated swing bridge in the State of Florida.

History
Lake Monroe Bridge was originally built between 1932 and 1933 as a replacement for a wooden bridge (tolled until 1926) that was manually operated. The bridge was a Warren-Truss Swing bridge, fabricated by Ingall's Iron Works of Birmingham, Alabama, the swing gear was manufactured by Earle Gear and Machine Company of Philadelphia, Pennsylvania, and was erected by W.W. White of St. Petersburg, Florida. The contracting company for the Florida State Road Department was Kreis Contracting Company of Knoxville, Tennessee.

Construction of the bridge provided economic relief to the region during the peak of the Great Depression, and the tourism it facilitated provided further relief after that period. When Interstate 4 was built in the late-1960s along with the original version of the nearby St. Johns River Veterans Memorial Bridge, it provided temporary relief for the Lake Monroe Bridge, which proved to be crucial after the opening of Walt Disney World southwest of Orlando. Unfortunately in the latter portion of the 20th Century, the bridge proved to be inadequate to handle more modern traffic. In 1994, the bridge was replaced by the  Bill Benedict Bridge a much higher concrete slab bridge that has four lanes, and was built between this and a CSX Railroad drawbridge that originally served the Atlantic Coast Line Railroad. The remnants of the bridge can now be found in Lake Monroe Wayside Park along US 17-92 in Sanford, and now survives as a fishing pier and overlook.

See also

References

External links
Lake Monroe Bridge
Benedict Bridge

Bridges in Seminole County, Florida
Bridges in Volusia County, Florida
Bridges over the St. Johns River
Bridges completed in 1933
Former road bridges in the United States
Road bridges in Florida
U.S. Route 17
U.S. Route 92
Bridges of the United States Numbered Highway System
DeBary, Florida
Former toll bridges in Florida
1933 establishments in Florida
1994 disestablishments in Florida
Steel bridges in the United States
Swing bridges in the United States
Warren truss bridges in the United States